Cold Shot may refer to:

Cold Shot, a musical group founded by American guitarist Anthony Gallo
"Cold Shot", a song by Stevie Ray Vaughan and Double Trouble from their 1984 album Couldn't Stand the Weather

See also
Molson Canadian Cold Shots, a brand used by Molson Coors